Wahlebach (in its upper course: Fahrenbach) is a river of Hesse, Germany. It flows into the Fulda in Kassel.

See also
List of rivers of Hesse

References

Rivers of Hesse
Rivers of Germany